This is a list of launches made by the PGM-17 Thor IRBM, and its derivatives, including the Delta family and the Japanese N-I, N-II and H-I rockets which were based on license-produced components. Between 2005 and February 2018, rockets in this family have flown 69 consecutive missions without failure.

Due to the number of launches, it has been split by decade:

List of Thor and Delta launches (1957–1959)
List of Thor and Delta launches (1960–1969)
List of Thor and Delta launches (1970–1979)
List of Thor and Delta launches (1980–1989)
List of Thor and Delta launches (1990–1999)
List of Thor and Delta launches (2000–2009)
List of Thor and Delta launches (2010–2019)
List of Thor and Delta launches (2020–2029)

Launch lists for selected rocket types:

List of Thor DM-18A launches
List of Thor DM-18 Able launches
List of Thor-Agena launches
List of Thor DM-18 Agena-A launches
List of Thor DM-21 Agena-B launches
List of Thor DM-21 Agena-D launches
List of Delta DM-19 launches
List of Delta 1 launches
List of Delta 2 launches
List of Delta 4 launches
List of Delta IV Medium launches
List of Delta IV Heavy launches
Launch lists based on outcome:
List of failed Thor and Delta launches

Launch statistics 

Statistics are up-to-date .

See also 

 List of Falcon 9 and Falcon Heavy launches
 List of Atlas launches
 List of Titan launches

Lists of Thor and Delta launches
Lists of Delta launches
Lists of Thor launches